Tyler Collins may refer to:

 Tyler Collins (singer) (born 1965), American R&B singer and actress
 Tyler Collins (actor), American actor and composer 
 Tyler Collins (baseball) (born 1990), American baseball player